Nicholas Romanov  may refer to:
 Nicholas I of Russia (1796–1855), third son of Paul I & Tsaritsa Maria Fedorovna; younger brother of Alexander I, ascended 1825
 Nicholas Alexandrovich, Tsesarevich of Russia (1843–1865), eldest son of Emperor Alexander II and Tsaritsa Maria Alexandrovna; grandson of Nicholas I
 Nicholas II of Russia (1868–1918), eldest son of Alexander III and Tsaritsa Maria Fedorovna, great-grandson of Nicholas I, ascended 1894
 Grand Duke Nicholas Konstantinovich of Russia (1850–1918), eldest son of Grand Duke Constantin Nicolaievich & Alexandra Josifovna of Saxe-Altenburg
 Grand Duke Nicholas Nikolaevich of Russia (1831–1891), third son of Emperor Nicholas I and Tsaritsa Alexandra Fedorovna, husband of Alexandra Petrovna
 Grand Duke Nicholas Nikolaevich of Russia (1856–1929), son of Grand Duke Nicholas Nicolaievich & Alexandra Petrovna of Oldenburg, husband of Anastasia Nicolaievna
 Grand Duke Nicholas Mikhailovich of Russia (1859–1919), eldest son of Grand Duke Mikhail Nicolaievich and Olga Fedorovna of Baden, unmarried
 Prince Nicholas Romanov (1922–2014), used the contested titulary Prince Nicholas of Russia